Patriarchy is the structuring of a society under male leaders.

Patriarchy may also refer to:

 Patriarchy, or patriarchate, the office or jurisdiction of an Eastern Orthodox patriarch
 Patriarchy, a 1980s Iranian TV series, known for its score by Bahram Dehghanyar
 "Patriarchy", the 2006 debut episode of the TV series Brothers & Sisters; see List of Brothers & Sisters episodes
 Patriarchy (book), a 2007 book by V Geetha
 Patriarchy: Notes of an Expert Witness, a 1994 book by Phyllis Chesler

See also
 Patriarch
 Patriarch (disambiguation)
 Patriarchal system (Western Zhou)